Rachel A. Blaney  (born 18 September 1974) is a Canadian politician who represents the federal electoral district of North Island—Powell River in the House of Commons. She was elected during the 2015 Canadian federal election to the 42nd Parliament and re-elected in the 2019 election to the 43rd Parliament. A member of the New Democratic Party was a member of an opposition party during both parliaments. During the 42nd Parliament she served as the party's critic for multiculturalism and then for seniors issues and veteran affairs. She introduced two bills: An Act to amend the Canadian Bill of Rights (right to housing) which sought to add the right to proper housing free of unreasonable barriers into the Canadian Bill of Rights, though it was defeated at second reading, and An Act to amend the Old Age Security Act (monthly guaranteed income supplement) to provide guaranteed income supplement recipients assistance in filing yearly taxes. During the 43rd Parliament, she became the NDP whip, remained critic for veteran affairs, and introduced one bill, An Act to establish National Food Waste Awareness Day and to provide for the development of a national strategy to reduce food waste in Canada, which if passed would have required the Minister of Agriculture and Agri-Food to create a national strategy to reduce food waste.

Background
Rachel Blaney was raised in Terrace, British Columbia, as an adoptive daughter of a Stellat'en First Nation family. She moved to Nanaimo to attend Malaspina University-College where she received a Bachelor of Arts degree in First Nation studies. She moved to Campbell River in 1998 where she married, and raised three children. She worked with the Homalco First Nation before becoming the executive director of the Immigrant Welcome Centre of North Vancouver Island (later the Multicultural and Immigrant Services Association of North Vancouver Island) in 2007.

In fall 2014, the 40-year-old Blaney sought to be the New Democratic Party (NDP) candidate in the North Island—Powell River riding for the upcoming 2015 federal election, gaining the candidacy over challenger Dave Coles, a retired union leader also from Campbell River. She was encouraged by a visit from party leader Tom Mulcair in December 2014, and campaigned throughout 2015 in preparation for the October election in which she was viewed as a likely contender to wrest her riding away from the Conservative Party. In the election, she electorally benefited from a wave of NDP support over Vancouver Island and defeated Conservative Party political advisor Laura Smith, retired meteorologist Peter Schwarzhoff for the Liberal Party and financial administrator Brenda Sayers for the Green Party.

42nd Canadian Parliament
Though Blaney was elected as a Member of Parliament to represent the North Island—Powell River constituency, her party had lost seats overall and formed the third party in the 42nd Canadian Parliament. She opened constituency offices in Powell River and a shared Campbell River office with MLA Claire Trevena. For constituency work, Blaney hosted numerous public meetings on a variety of topics, including hosting Romeo Saganash to discuss aboriginal affairs and the NDP critic on international trade Tracey Ramsey to discuss the Trans-Pacific Partnership. Party leader Tom Mulcair assigned her to be the party's critic on multiculturalism issues and deputy critic (to Matthew Dubé) for the Ministry of Infrastructure and Communities. Mulcair reassigned her critic role from multiculturalism to seniors issues in February 2017. Also in 2017, Blaney was named as a defendant in a defamation lawsuit for a Facebook post that read, "Taxpayers paid $550,000 for what? No notes, nothing tracking the work he had done.". The lawsuit was filed by Gordon Wilson, whose politically appointed position as "LNG - Buy BC Advocate" was eliminated by a new provincial government and that Blaney ought to have known that the post was false. In the October 2017 NDP leadership election Blaney endorsed Jagmeet Singh, who went on to win and appoint Blaney as the party's Deputy Whip under Marjolaine Boutin-Sweet, and a year later, in 2019, added critic for veterans affair to her portfolio.

Blaney introduced two bills into parliament. First, An Act to amend the Canadian Bill of Rights (right to housing) (Bill C-325), sought to add the right to proper housing free of unreasonable barriers into the Canadian Bill of Rights. It was the same bill that Peter Stoffer had introduced in the previous four parliaments (38 through 41), but while it received first reading in December 2016, the bill was defeated at second reading in November 2017 with both the Liberal and Conservative parties voting against it. Blaney went on to introduced An Act to amend the Old Age Security Act (monthly guaranteed income supplement) (Bill C-449), in May 2019, which sought to allow guaranteed income supplement recipients additional time to file taxes and to mandate Employment and Social Development Canada to provide assistance in their tax filings. Along with Courtenay—Alberni MP Gord Johns, she advocated for reversing the previous government's scheduled closure of the Comox Marine Communications and Traffic Services. While the new government directed the Standing Committee on Fisheries and Oceans to review the closure, they ultimately upheld it.

43rd Canadian Parliament
Blaney sought reelection in 2019 Canadian federal election but was again challenged by Schwarzhoff for the Liberal Party, as well as Port McNeill town councillor Shelley Downey for the Conservative Party. While Blaney won her North Island—Powell River riding, the 43rd Canadian Parliament convened in December 2019 with a Liberal Party minority government with her NDP being the fourth largest party. NDP leader Singh appointed Blaney to be party whip and kept her as critic for veterans affairs. During the 43rd Parliament Blaney introduced one private member's bill: Bill C-283 An Act to establish National Food Waste Awareness Day and to provide for the development of a national strategy to reduce food waste in Canada. It was the same bill as was introduced by Ruth Ellen Brosseau in the 42nd Parliament, though it never came up for second reading in either parliament. The bill proposed to require the Minister of Agriculture and Agri-Food to develop and implement a national strategy to reduce food waste and make October 16 "National Food Waste Awareness Day".

Electoral record

References

External links 

 Rachel Blaney - New Democratic Member of Parliament (North Island—Powell River)

External links
 Bill C-325

1974 births
Living people
New Democratic Party MPs
Members of the House of Commons of Canada from British Columbia
People from Campbell River, British Columbia
People from Powell River, British Columbia
Women members of the House of Commons of Canada
Women in British Columbia politics
21st-century Canadian politicians
21st-century Canadian women politicians